Neritilia littoralis is a species of submarine cave snail, a marine gastropod mollusc in the family Neritiliidae.

Description

Distribution

References

Neritiliidae
Gastropods described in 2003